The Operative is a 2019 internationally co-produced thriller film, written and directed by Israeli filmmaker Yuval Adler, based on the Hebrew novel The English Teacher (המורה לאנגלית) by Yiftach Reicher-Atir, a former intelligence officer. It stars Diane Kruger, Martin Freeman and Cas Anvar.

It had its world premiere at the Berlin International Film Festival on February 10, 2019. It was released on August 2, 2019, by Vertical Entertainment.

Plot
Thomas (Martin Freeman) is a British Jew who until a year ago used to work for Israel's Mossad intelligence agency in Germany. Now he is retired but still has access to some of his former employer's systems and resources. He receives a mysterious phone call from Rachel (Diane Kruger), another former agent whom he had recruited and who had become a friend but disappeared. Summoned to a safe house in Cologne in order to help find Rachel and determine her motives, Thomas reviews Rachel's recruitment and past assignments with his former supervisors through a series of flashbacks.

Rachel's last known assignment was to pose as an English teacher in Tehran and observe Farhad Razavi (Cas Anvar), heir to an Iranian electronics firm.  Flashback scenes reveal Rachel's acclimatisation to routines of daily life so as not to arouse suspicion.  Eventually, she meets Farhad, who asks her to give him English lessons, leading to a romantic relationship as Farhad also introduces her to Tehran's underground nightlife.

Rachel's personal involvement with Farhad allows Thomas to involve him in the smuggling of parts for Iran's nuclear program, which will work to undermine that program and make Farhad a target for recruitment as a Mossad resource.  Some of the related assignments put her own life in serious danger.  Eventually, Rachel rebels against her assignment, changes her identity, and cuts off communication with Thomas until, returning to the film's present, she needs his help to return to a life of her own without risking assassination because she might be a security threat herself.

Cast
 Diane Kruger as Rachel
 Martin Freeman as Thomas
 Cas Anvar as Farhad
 Liron Levo as Dan
 Yaakov Zada Daniel as Aran
 Ohad Knoller as Stephen

Production
In February 2018, it was announced Diane Kruger and Eric Bana had joined the cast of the film, with Yuval Adler directing from a screenplay he wrote. Eitan Mansuri, Anne Carey, Michael Weber and Viola Fügen would serve as producers on the film under their Spiro Films, Archer Gray, Match Factory Productions banners, while Teddy Schwarzman would serve as an executive producer under his Black Bear Pictures banner. In May 2018, Cas Anvar and Martin Freeman joined the cast of the film, replacing Bana.

Release
The film had its world premiere at the Berlin International Film Festival on February 10, 2019. Shortly after, Vertical Entertainment acquired distribution rights to the film. It was released on August 2, 2019.

Reception

Box office
The Operative grossed a total worldwide of $1.4 million.

Critical response
Although many reviewers appreciated Diane Kruger's performance and a couple of especially suspenseful scenes, critics were also disappointed in Rachel's unclear motivations, a lack of chemistry between her and Farhad, and an overly-complex plot structure.  Guy Lodge, reviewing the film at the Berlin Film Festival for Variety, remarks " . . . the general shape of the plotting is too recognizable to keep us entirely on edge, despite the stoic, furrowed-brow dedication of the cast," while The Hollywood Reporter complained that Kruger "needs more textured material than she's given in this choppy espionage thriller."

On the film's American release, Ben Kenigsberg, in The New York Times, described the film as offering "a few suspenseful sequences, some interesting nuts-and-bolts details of espionage work and a good lead performance en route to an unsatisfying ending."  Critic Christy Lemire gave the film two out of four stars, writing that "the overall sluggish pace and prevailing feeling of ambiguity ultimately make “The Operative” an unsatisfying, frustrating experience."

The website's critics consensus reads, "Diane Kruger delivers an appropriately steely performance, but The Operative pursues a forgettable mission that fans of the genre will find all too familiar." On Metacritic, the film has a weighted average score of 47 out of 100, based on 10 critics, indicating "mixed or average reviews".

References

External links
 
 
 The Operative at rogerebert.com

2019 films
2019 thriller films
2010s English-language films
2010s spy thriller films
American spy thriller films
Black Bear Pictures films
English-language French films
English-language German films
Films about the Mossad
Films set in Germany
Films set in Jerusalem
Films set in Tehran
Films set in Turkey
Films shot in Germany
Films shot in Israel
French spy thriller films
German spy thriller films
Vertical Entertainment films
2010s American films
2010s French films
2010s German films